Fanniomyces is a genus of fungi in the family Laboulbeniaceae. The genus contain two species.

References

External links
Fanniomyces at Index Fungorum

Laboulbeniaceae
Laboulbeniales genera